Jawahar Navodaya Vidyalaya, Deoghar (JNV Deoghar) is a school in Deoghar town of Jharkhand, India. It is one of the approximately 593 Jawahar Navodaya Vidyalayas in the country. Jawahar Navodaya Vidyalayas are schools for talented children generally from poor families. They form a part of the system of gifted education. The objectives of the scheme are to provide education to talented children predominantly from the rural areas, irrespective of their family's socio-economic condition. As much as 80% of the seats are reserved for candidates from the rural areas of the district.

Admission procedure 
Talented students of the district are selected through an All India Level Entrance Exam called Jawahar Navodaya Vidyalaya Selection Test(JNVST) conducted each year by CBSE and are given admission to 6th standard/class in the Navodaya. Till 1998, the Jawahar Navodaya Vidyalaya Selection Test (JNVST) was conducted by the National Council of Educational Research and Training, however it is conducted by Central Board of Secondary Education ever since. The test is largely non-verbal and objective in nature and is designed to prevent any disadvantage to children from rural areas. Now admissions are also taken in Class IX and XI. During academic year 2008-09 admissions will be allowed in Class VIII. These admissions are conducted through an objective and descriptive test containing questions on English, Mathematics, Science, & Social Sciences. This "Lateral Entry" system is devised to fill the vacancies that arise due to withdrawal of admissions of the children who are admitted in class VI.

Eligibility 
The Vidyalaya have an objective of providing opportunity and education to the underprivileged children of rural areas, the entrance requirements have special provisions for those from a Government recognised school in a rural area. 75% of the seats are reserved in district for students from rural areas and remaining seats are filled with students from urban areas. Reservation of seats in favor of children belonging to Scheduled Castes and Scheduled Tribes is also provided. 1/3 of the seats are for girl students. 3% of the seats are for disabled children.

Since 2005, a moderate and uniform fee structure is implemented to reduce the dependency on Government. However, girls are exempted from paying any fees, as are all students from underprivileged areas.

References

External links
Navodaya Vidyalaya Samiti
Schools of hope - Business Today Article

Schools in Jharkhand
Jawahar Navodaya Vidyalayas in Jharkhand
Deoghar
Educational institutions established in 1997
1997 establishments in Bihar